The New Richmond News Building is a historic building located at 154 Second Street in New Richmond, Wisconsin. It was built in 1913, and was added to the National Register of Historic Places in 1988.

References

Buildings and structures in St. Croix County, Wisconsin
Commercial buildings on the National Register of Historic Places in Wisconsin
Commercial buildings completed in 1913
1913 establishments in Wisconsin
Newspaper headquarters in the United States
National Register of Historic Places in St. Croix County, Wisconsin